Skórzec  is a village in Siedlce County, Masovian Voivodeship, in east-central Poland. It is the seat of the gmina (administrative district) called Gmina Skórzec.

The village has a population of 1,069.

References

Villages in Siedlce County